Vesik is an Estonian surname. Notable people with the surname include:

Iiris Vesik (born 1991), Estonian singer and stage actress
Rivo Vesik (born 1980), Estonian beach volleyball player

Estonian-language surnames